Grant Rix (born ) is an Australian former professional rugby league footballer who played in the 1980s and 1990s. During his career he played in the Brisbane Rugby League premiership for Fortitude Valley Diehards, the New South Wales Rugby League premiership with the Brisbane Broncos and in England with Halifax. Rix had huge potential and was seen to be the successor to Wally Lewis until he was struck with successive knee operations and was forced to retire aged 24 years.

Playing career
Rix was selected for the Australian Schoolboys 1982 & 1983 and Queensland v New Zealand 1984 (18 years 254 days old). He toured Papua New Guinea with the President's XIII Australian side in 1985. Rix was selected for Queensland for State of Origin III in 1986 (49th player to be selected for Queensland), but did not take the field.  Rix played for the Brisbane Broncos between 1988 and 1990.

Challenge Cup Final appearances
Rix played , i.e. number 4, in Halifax's 19–18 victory over St. Helens in the 1987 Challenge Cup Final during the 1986–87 season at Wembley Stadium, London on Saturday 2 May 1987 with a crowd of 94,652.

Post playing
Rix was a member of the Brisbane coaching staff between 1991 and 1993.  Rix then coached the Norths Devils between 1994 and 1995.

References

External links

Queensland representatives at qrl.com.au
Statistics at rugbyleagueproject.org

1965 births
Australian rugby league players
Queensland Rugby League State of Origin players
Fortitude Valley Diehards players
Brisbane Broncos players
Living people
Rugby league centres